The 2015 FIVB Women's World Cup was held from August 22 to September 6 in Japan. The tournament was a qualification process for the 2016 Summer Olympics in Rio de Janeiro, Brazil.

The top two ranked teams, China and Serbia, qualified for the Olympics, and joined Brazil as they had already secured a berth as the host country.

Information
The FIVB Volleyball World Cup began with signing a contract between Fédération Internationale de Volleyball (FIVB) and Japan Volleyball Association (JVA) for hosting the tournament on 31 January 2013. In this event, Fuji TV had the right to broadcast the tournament. Moreover, the FIVB released the qualification process of the tournament:
 Host country
 2014 World champions
 2 teams per Continental confederation considered by World ranking, Continental ranking, or Continental championship
But, on 10 March 2015, the FIVB announced a change of the continental events following each continental confederation's agreement.
 AVC used the World ranking as of 1 January 2015.
 CAVB used the African Championship.
 CEV used the European ranking as of 1 January 2015.
 CSV held a qualification tournament.
 NORCECA used the 2015 NORCECA Champion Cup (Final Four).

Changes
 Olympics places  Only the winners and runners-up of the competition could secure the berths in the 2016 Olympic Games. It was different from last edition which three medalists teams joined the Olympics.
 Qualification format  The 2015 World Cup changed the format of the competition following the information above. There were not 2 wild card teams like 2011 edition. One of these spots belonged to the World champions, the other one belonged to the 2nd place of a continental event (2011 edition gave tickets to 4 of 5 continents, but 2015 edition gave tickets to all 5 continents).
 Competition format  Competition rounds decreased from 4 in 2011 to 3. Combining rounds 1 (3 days) and 2 (2 days) in 2011 to 1 round of 5 days. The hosts also reduced the venues from 8 to 6.
 Pool ranking criteria  In 2011 edition, match points was the first criterion, but 2015 changed it to number of matches won. All criteria are shown in section Pool standing procedure.
 Net touch  In this edition, players can not touch the whole net and antennas, not just the white band like in 2011 edition.
 Roster  All 14 players (maximum 12 regular players and maximum 2 liberos) can play in every match and be named in score sheets.
 Individual awards  Individual awards were given to players by positions, unlike previous editions when awards were given to players by volleyball skills.
 Attribution of points FIVB approved the proposal that in case the team hosting the Olympic Games participated in a previous World Cup then they would keep the World Ranking points gained at the previous World Cup.
 Referee  It was the first time in the competition when there was a challenge referee. In each match, there was a referee who controlled the challenge system.

Qualification
12 teams participated in the World Cup. Only teams who had not yet qualified for the 2016 Olympic Games could compete in the tournament.

Squads
Maximum of 12 regular players and maximum of 2 liberos can be selected to play in the tournament. The rosters of 14 players of each team can be seen in the article below.

Venues

Format

The competition system of the 2015 World Cup for women is the single Round-Robin system. Each team plays once against each of the 11 remaining teams. 
The teams were divided into 2 groups of 6 teams each. In round 1, total 30 matches in 5 days, each team plays against the other teams from the same group. For rounds 2 and 3, total 36 matches in 6 days, each teams play against the teams from another group. 
The pools composition followed the Serpentine system based on the World ranking where the host team was at the top position. Numbers in brackets denoted the FIVB World Ranking as of 13 October 2014 except the hosts who ranked 4th.

Pool standing procedure
 Number of matches won
 Match points
 Sets ratio
 Points ratio
 Result of the last match between the tied teams

Match won 3–0 or 3–1: 3 match points for the winner, 0 match points for the loser 
Match won 3–2: 2 match points for the winner, 1 match point for the loser

Results

|}

All times are Japan Standard Time (UTC+09:00).

First round

Site A

|}

Site B

|}

Second round

Site A

|}

Site B

|}

Third round

Site A

|}

Site B

|}

Final standing

Awards

 Most Valuable Player
  Zhu Ting
 Best Setter
  Niverka Marte
 Best Outside Hitters  Brankica Mihajlović
  Tatiana Kosheleva

 Best Middle Blockers  Daymara Lescay
  TeTori Dixon
 Best Opposite Hitter  Nataliya Obmochaeva
 Best Libero'''
  Brenda Castillo

Statistics leaders

References

External links
 Player statistics

2015 Women
FIVB World Cup Women
FIVB Volleyball Women's World Cup
International volleyball competitions hosted by Japan
Volleyball qualification for the 2016 Summer Olympics
August 2015 sports events in Japan
September 2015 sports events in Japan
Women's volleyball in Japan
Vol